Basta is a rural locality (a selo) in Limansky District, Astrakhan Oblast, Russia. The population was 29 as of 2010. There are 2 streets.

Geography 
Basta is located 24 km east of Liman (the district's administrative centre) by road. Olya is the nearest rural locality.

References 

Rural localities in Limansky District